Sheldon Ekland-Olson (born 1944 in California) is an American sociologist and Rapoport Centennial Professor of sociology at the University of Texas at Austin (UT-Austin).

Education and career
Ekland-Olson received his bachelor's degree from Seattle Pacific University in 1966 and his Ph.D. from the University of Washington in 1971. He went on to serve as a special assistant to the chancellor of the University of Texas system from 1988 to 1991. He was the associate dean of the University of Texas at Austin College of Liberal Arts from 1991 to 1993, whereupon he became the College's dean. In 1998, he became the executive vice president and provost of UT-Austin, a position he held until 2006. He has also been the director of UT-Austin's Division of Statistics and Scientific Computation and the School of Human Ecology.

Books

Steve J. Martin and Sheldon Ekland-Olson Texas Prisons:  And the Walls Came Tumbling Down. Austin, Texas:  Texas Monthly Press.

1993	Sheldon Ekland-Olson and William Kelly Justice Under Pressure:  A Comparison of Recidivism Patterns Among Four Successive Parolee Cohorts.  New York:  Springer-Verlag.

1994	James Marquart, Sheldon Ekland-Olson and Jon Sorensen.  The Rope, The Chair and The Needle: Capital Punishment in Texas 1923-1990.  Austin, Texas:  University of Texas Press.

2011	Sheldon Ekland-Olson.  Who Lives, Who Dies, Who Decides? – Abortion, Neonatal Care, Assisted Dying, and Capital Punishment.  New York: Routledge 

	Hamilton Book Award

2012	Sheldon Ekland-Olson and Julie Beicken.  How Ethical Systems Change:  Eugenics, the Final Solution, Bioethics. New York: Routledge.

2012	Sheldon Ekland-Olson and Elyshia Aseltine. How Ethical Systems Change: Abortion and Neonatal Care . New York: Routledge.

2012 	Sheldon Ekland-Olson and Elyshia Aseltine.  How Ethical Systems Change:  Tolerable Suffering and Assisted Dying.  New York: Routledge.

2012	Sheldon Ekland-Olson and Danielle Dirks.  How Ethical Systems Change:  Lynching and Capital Punishment.  New York: Routledge.

2013	Sheldon Ekland-Olson. Life and Death Decisions: The Quest for Morality and Justice. New York: Routledge

2014	Sheldon Ekland-Olson.  Who Lives, Who Dies, Who Decides? – Abortion, Neonatal Care, Assisted Dying, and Capital Punishment.  New York: Routledge Revised Edition

2014	Sheldon Ekland-Olson. Life and Death Decisions: The Quest for Morality and Justice. New York: Routledge  Revised Edition

2017	Sheldon Ekland-Olson and Jack P. Gibbs.  Science and Sociology: Predictive Power is the Name of the Game.  Routledge/Taylor Francis.

References

Living people
1944 births
University of Texas at Austin faculty
Seattle Pacific University alumni
University of Washington alumni